Tracy J. Belton (born May 8, 1984) is an American football defensive back who is currently a free agent. He played college football at the University of Massachusetts Amherst and attended Largo High School in Upper Marlboro, Maryland. He has also been a member of the Arkansas Twisters, Green Bay Blizzard, Milwaukee Iron, Georgia Force, Jacksonville Sharks, Orlando Predators, New Orleans VooDoo and the Philadelphia Soul.

Early life
Belton attended Largo High School where he played football and basketball. Belton was named honorable mention All-Metro as a senior in 2001. Belton spent a season at Fork Union Military Academy as a post-graduate.

College career
In 2003, Belton committed to Massachusetts. Belton played for the UMass Minutemen from 2003 to 2006. He was the team's starter his final three years and helped the Minutemen to 36 wins. He played in 49 games during his career, including 41 starts at cornerback.

Statistics
Sources:

Professional career
Belton was rated the 167th best cornerback in the 2007 NFL Draft by NFLDraftScout.com.

Arkansas Twisters
Belton joined the Arkansas Twisters of af2.

Green Bay Blizzard
Belton left the Twisters in 2009 to join the Green Bay Blizzard. Belton was named First Team All-af2 following the season.

Milwaukee Iron
On March 14, 2010, Belton was assigned to the Milwaukee Iron.

Georgia Force
Belton was assigned to the Georgia Force on October 7, 2010. Belton was assigned to the Force again on January 23, 2012. Belton was named Second Team All-Arena following the 2012 season.

Jacksonville Sharks
On February 6, 2013, Belton was assigned to the Jacksonville Sharks on a two-year contract.

Orlando Predators
On April 9, 2014, Belton was traded with Kyle Rowley to complete an earlier trade that sent Aaron Garcia. Belton was assigned to the Predators on December 8, 2014.

New Orleans VooDoo
On March 22, 2015, Belton was traded to the New Orleans VooDoo for future considerations.

Philadelphia Soul
Belton was assigned to the Philadelphia Soul in 2016, where he earned the Arena Football League Defensive Player of the Year Award and First Team All-Arena. Belton helped guide the Soul to an ArenaBowl XXIX championship.

Washington Valor
Belton was assigned to the Washington Valor on January 25, 2017. He earned First Team All-Arena honors in 2017.

AFL statistics

Stats from ArenaFan:

References

External links
 UMass Minutemen bio
 

Living people
1984 births
Players of American football from Maryland
American football defensive backs
UMass Minutemen football players
Arkansas Twisters players
Green Bay Blizzard players
Milwaukee Iron players
Georgia Force players
Jacksonville Sharks players
Orlando Predators players
New Orleans VooDoo players
Philadelphia Soul players
Washington Valor players